Stephany Lee of Colorado Springs, Colorado is an American wrestler who won the 2012 U.S. Olympic Trials at 72 kg women's freestyle class and was scheduled to compete at the 2012 Olympics before a drug test forced her out.

Life 
Stephany attended Missouri Valley College.

Stephany defeated Ali Bernard 2 to 0 at the finals of the 2012 U.S. Olympic Trials.

Less than 48 hours after the Olympic Trials, Stephany became married.

On June 28, Lee was stripped of her Olympic spot after she tested positive for marijuana. It was her second positive, the first in 2009. As a result of the sanctions, Lee was forced to retroactively forfeit any honors and medals from 2009. She also earned a one-year suspension. Bernard was named the replacement to represent the United States at the 72 kg class.

References 

Living people
American female sport wrestlers
Year of birth missing (living people)
Lesbian sportswomen
American LGBT sportspeople
LGBT sport wrestlers
21st-century American women